Events from the year 2014 in Denmark.

Incumbents
 Monarch – Margrethe II
 Prime minister – Helle Thorning Schmidt

Events

January
 30 January – The Socialist People's Party departs Prime Minister Helle Thorning-Schmidt's government due to a conflict over the proposed sale of DONG Energy shares to Goldman Sachs.

May
 6–10 May – Copenhagen hosts the 2014 Eurovision Song Contest, which is won by Austria.
 25 May – The European Parliament election was held.

August
 1–8 August – Crown Prince Frederik, Crown Princess Mary and their children pay an official visit to Greenland.

Culture

Architecture
 7 March –  C. F. Møller Architects' refurbishment of Aalborg Waterfront, Henning Larsen Architects' Roskilde Campus and Vartorv Square in Copenhagen receive Civic Trust Awards.
 15 May –  BIG's Danish Maritime Museum and underground multi-purpose hall for Gammel Hellerup Gymnasium receive Architizer A+ Awards at a ceremony in New York City.
 19 November – Lene Tranberg receives the Prince Eugen Medal in Stockholm.
 19 November – Lene Tranberg receives the Prince Eugen Medal in Stockholm.

Film
 16 January – The Hunt is nominated in the category Best Foreign Language Film at the 86th Academy Awards.
 2 March – Danish short film Helium wins the award of Best Live Action Short Film at the 86th Academy Awards.

Literature
 23 January – Anne-Cathrine Riebnitzsky receives De Gyldne Laurbær for her novel, Forbandede yngel.

Media

Music
 8 March – Basim wins Dansk Melodi Grand Prix 2014 and represents Denmark in the Eurovision Song Contest 2014 on 10 May with the song "Cliche Love Song".

Sport

Badminton
 23–27 April – With three gold medals, four silver medals and three bronze medals, Denmark finishes as the best nation at the 2014 European Badminton Championships.
 2531 August  Denmark wins three bronze medals at the 2014 BWF World Championships.

Golf
 26 October – Thorbjørn Olesen wins Perth International.

Handball
 12–26 January – Denmark hosts the 2014 European Men's Handball Championship.

Motorsports
 2 August – Denmark wins the 2014 Speedway World Cup.

Swimming
 	13–24 August  2014 European Aquatics Championships
 18 August  Jeanette Ottesen wins a silver medal in Women's 50 metre butterfly.
 20 August  Rikke Møller Pedersen wins a gold medal in  Women's 100 metre breaststroke.
 21 August Viktor Bromer wins a gold medal in Men's 200 metre butterfly.
 21 August  Mie Nielsen wins a gold medal in Women's 100 metre backstroke.
 22 August  Jeanette Ottesen wins a gold medal in Women's 100 metre butterfly.
 22 August  Rikke Møller Pedersen wins a gold medal in Women's 200 metre breaststroke.
 23 August  Mie Nielsen wins a bronze medal in Women's 50 metre backstroke.
 24 August  Jeanette Ottesen wins a bronze medal in Women's 50 metre freestyle.
 24 August  Denmark wins a gold medal in Women's 4 × 100 metre medley relay.

Other
 610 August  Denmark wins two gold medals and one bronze medal at the 2014 ICF Canoe Sprint World Championships.

Births

Deaths
 2 January – Countess Anne Dorte of Rosenborg, member of the extended Danish royal family (born 1947)
 9 January – Margrethe Schanne, ballerina (born 1921)
 5 January – Mogens E. Pedersen, journalist (born 1928)
 9 February – Gabriel Axel, film director, actor, writer and producer (born 1918)
 13 February – Richard Møller Nielsen, football player and manager (born 1937)
 15 March – Jesper Langballe, Lutheran priest and politician (born 1939)
 5 April – Poul Erik Bech, football manager (born 1938)
 20 May – Jørn Ege, controversial doctor (born 1955)
 30 May – Henning Carlsen, film director, screenwriter and producer (born 1927)
 5 July – Søsser Krag, daughter of actress Helle Virkner and former prime minister Jens Otto Krag, journalist and former model (born 1962)
 12 September – Henrik Have, author and artist (born 1946)
 20 September – Erik Ninn-Hansen, politician (born 1922)
 13 October – Jess Ingerslev, actor (born 1947)
 26 October – Count Claus Ahlefeldt-Laurvig-Bille, aristocrat and author (born 1932)
 6 November – William Rosenberg, actor (born 1920)
 11 November – Jan Lindhardt, theologian and writer (born 1938)
 22 December – Vera Gebuhr, actress (born 1916)

See also
2014 in Danish television

References

 
Years of the 21st century in Denmark
Denmark
2010s in Denmark
Denmark